The 1954 DFB-Pokal Final decided the winner of the 1953–54 DFB-Pokal, the 11th season of Germany's knockout football cup competition. It was played on 17 April 1954 at the Südweststadion in Ludwigshafen. VfB Stuttgart won the match 1–0 after extra time against 1. FC Köln, to claim their 1st cup title.

Route to the final
The DFB-Pokal began with 8 teams in a single-elimination knockout cup competition. There were a total of two rounds leading up to the final. Teams were drawn against each other, and the winner after 90 minutes would advance. If still tied, 30 minutes of extra time was played. If the score was still level, a replay would take place at the original away team's stadium. If still level after 90 minutes, 30 minutes of extra time was played. If the score was still level, a drawing of lots would decide who would advance to the next round.

Note: In all results below, the score of the finalist is given first (H: home; A: away).

Match

Details

References

External links
 Match report at kicker.de 
 Match report at WorldFootball.net
 Match report at Fussballdaten.de 

VfB Stuttgart matches
1. FC Köln matches
1953–54 in German football cups
1954
Sport in Ludwigshafen
20th century in Ludwigshafen
April 1954 sports events in Europe